Denizli Museum, also known as Denizli Atatürk and Ethnography Museum, is a national museum in Denizli, Turkey. Established in 1984, it is a historic house museum dedicated to Atatürk, and also exhibits ethnographical items.

History
Atatürk, the founder of modern Turkey, had visited Denizli on 4 February 1931 and stayed in this house. It was later on bought by the Ministry of Culture and was established as a museum. The museum was opened on 4 February 1984, on the 53rd anniversary of Atatürk's visit.

Exhibits
The ground floor is the ethnographical section. Ornaments, silver tools, woodwork etc. are displayed in the small rooms. The big room is reserved for weapons such as yatagans, swords, riffles, guns etc. A flag, which was used in a meeting during  the War of Independence in 1919 and the uniform of Hüseyin Efe, a local hero of 1920s, are also exhibited in this room.

In three rooms of the upper floor, life style of Denizli citizens were depicted by mannequins. Two rooms are dedicated to Atatürk, which were occupied by him when he had visited Denizli in 1931. One room was his bedroom and the other his office. In anteroom, there is an oil painting by İbrahim Çallı and various house furniture donated by Necip Ali Küçüka, a former Turkish politician and jurist.

References

Atatürk museums
Historic house museums in Turkey
Ethnographic museums in Turkey
1984 establishments in Turkey
Museums established in 1984
Museums in Denizli Province